The 1997 FIA Formula One World Championship was the 51st season of FIA Formula One motor racing. It commenced on 9 March and ended on 26 October after seventeen races. The Drivers' Championship was won by Jacques Villeneuve and the Constructors' Championship was awarded to Williams-Renault.

The 1997 Formula One calendar featured two new events in the Luxembourg Grand Prix, as well as the Austrian Grand Prix, the latter of which returned to the calendar after a ten-year absence. The only race exiting the calendar was the Portuguese Grand Prix after 13 years raced at the Autódromo do Estoril.

Future race winners, Ralf Schumacher and Jarno Trulli made their debut in this season.

The championship was decided under highly controversial circumstances as championship leader Michael Schumacher deliberately rammed Villeneuve whilst trying to defend his race lead in the final round of the championship at the European Grand Prix at Jerez, Spain. Schumacher came to a halt in the gravel trap and was deemed at fault for the accident by FIA – being punished by being stripped of his 2nd place in the championship. Villeneuve finished third in the race in spite of the contact. Schumacher still kept his five race wins. Villeneuve won seven races, but would never win a Formula One Grand Prix again before his 2006 retirement. 1997 also saw the retirement of Gerhard Berger after many years in the sport, as well as the first race win for Heinz-Harald Frentzen and Mika Häkkinen.

As of 2022, this is the last championship for a non-European driver, the last Constructors' and Drivers' championships for Williams.

This also notably marked the last season with teams fielding V8-powered cars, until .

Teams and drivers
The following teams and drivers competed in the 1997 FIA Formula One World Championship.

† All engines were 3.0-litre configuration.

Team changes
Two new teams came into Formula One in 1997: Stewart, who arrived with the backing of the Ford Motor Company; and Lola, which only entered the 1997 Australian Grand Prix after the team's dismal performance in the Grand Prix which saw a lack of sponsorship for the next Grand Prix in Brazil. Tyrrell changed their engines as well, swapping the Yamaha engines in preference to the Ford engines. Jordan-Peugeot signed up highly rated British engineer Dr John Davis. He helped the team with its new windtunnel facility at Brackley, the tunnel itself was funded by Ferrari in exchange for Eddie Irvine who moved to Ferrari the previous year. Sauber, in partnership with new sponsor Petronas, formed Sauber Petronas Engineering and through the newly established engineering company secured the licensing rights to engine and gearbox components from Ferrari, allowing them to build and run nearly identical units to those used in the Ferraris. The engines were branded as Petronas, in deference to the role the company played in their development.
 
Bridgestone entered into F1 and supplied tyres to Arrows, Prost, Minardi, Stewart and Lola.

Driver changes
 Pre-season changes
 Arrows: The biggest news at the beginning of the 1997 season was Damon Hill, 1996 champion, being dropped by Williams in favour of Heinz-Harald Frentzen. Hill was partnered with Brazilian Pedro Diniz, signed from Ligier. Ricardo Rosset joined the newly formed Lola team, while Jos Verstappen found a home at Tyrrell Racing.
 Williams: The champion team dismissed the 1996 World Champion Damon Hill and employed Heinz-Harald Frentzen, the German whom the team had wanted to sign for several years, to partner Jacques Villeneuve.
 Prost (ex-Ligier): Reliant on their Japanese engine partners Mugen-Honda, Shinji Nakano, a Japanese driver, joined Prost to partner Olivier Panis for the season; Nakano replaced Diniz who went to Arrows.
 Sauber: Thanks in part to the deal allowing Sauber to license, manufacture and utilise Ferrari's engine and gearbox components, Ferrari test driver Nicola Larini signed with Sauber where he would partner existing driver Johnny Herbert. Larini replaced Heinz-Harald Frentzen, who had moved to Williams.
 Jordan: The Irish team changed their driver line-up for 1997. Ralf Schumacher, Michael's younger brother, was given the team leader's seat; he was rumoured to be partnered with Nigel Mansell, but the 1992 champion rejected the offer. Instead, Jordan went for Giancarlo Fisichella, who had raced for the Alfa Romeo factory team in the International Touring Car Championship the previous year, as well as making some appearances for Minardi. Rubens Barrichello went to a new team, Stewart Grand Prix, while Martin Brundle was unable to find a seat and reluctantly retired, taking up a position as a television broadcaster.
 Tyrrell: Ukyo Katayama left Tyrrell for Minardi and was replaced by Jos Verstappen, previously of Footwork. Mika Salo was retained.
 Minardi: Minardi ran Italian rising star Jarno Trulli alongside Ukyo Katayama, who had moved from Tyrrell, for the 1997 season. The announcement of the Italian filled the final seat in the 1997 Formula 1 World Championship. The decision was made after Minardi released his promising countryman Giancarlo Fisichella from his contract so that he could join Jordan. Having signed Ukyo Katayama, and his Mild Seven sponsorship, for one seat, owner Giancarlo Minardi felt that his team needed a young Italian and Trulli was the obvious choice for Minardi. Katayama replaced Pedro Lamy, who moved into the FIA GT Championship.
 Stewart: The first of the two new teams, Stewart, hired Rubens Barrichello from Jordan, and partnered him with Jan Magnussen. Magnussen had raced in CART in 1996, but had appeared in one F1 race in 1995 for McLaren, substituting for an unwell Mika Häkkinen.
 Lola: Lola, as the other new team, recruited Ricardo Rosset from Footwork and Benetton's test driver Vincenzo Sospiri.
 Forti: The Italian team ceased to exist midway through 1996, and neither of their drivers, Luca Badoer and Andrea Montermini, were able to find a seat for 1997. Badoer moved into the FIA GT Championship, while Montermini became a test driver for Lola. Badoer would eventually return to F1 in 1999 with Minardi.
 Ferrari (Michael Schumacher and Eddie Irvine), Benetton (Jean Alesi and Gerhard Berger) and McLaren (Mika Häkkinen and David Coulthard) retained their 1996 line-ups.

 Mid-season changes
The Lola team folded after the Australian Grand Prix, leaving Ricardo Rosset and Vincenzo Sospiri out of a drive. Rosset returned to F1 in 1998 with Tyrrell, while Sospiri saw out the 1997 season in IndyCar with Team Scandia.
A series of disagreements with Peter Sauber saw Nicola Larini leave Sauber after the Monaco Grand Prix. He was replaced by Gianni Morbidelli, who had last raced in F1 with Footwork in 1995, and had spent 1996 testing for Jordan. 
Gerhard Berger fell ill before the Canadian Grand Prix and was unable to race for Benetton. He was replaced by countryman Alexander Wurz. Berger ultimately missed three races as he recovered from the illness and the death of his father, before returning at the German Grand Prix. Wurz would get a full-time drive with the team in 1998, as Berger retired at the end of this season.
During the Canadian Grand Prix, Prost's Olivier Panis crashed heavily and broke his leg. He was replaced by Minardi driver Jarno Trulli, who in turn was replaced by Tarso Marques, who had also made some appearances for the Minardi team the previous year. Panis missed seven races before returning at the Luxembourg Grand Prix, while Trulli would join him as a full-time Prost driver in 1998.
Between the Canadian and French Grands Prix, Gianni Morbidelli had an accident in testing and broke his arm, meaning Sauber had to make their second substitution of the year. They brought in test driver Norberto Fontana, who completed the next three races before Morbidelli's return at the 1997 Hungarian Grand Prix. Morbidelli suffered another testing accident following the Japanese Grand Prix, so Fontana competed again at the season-ending European Grand Prix.

Calendar
The following seventeen Grands Prix took place in 1997.

Calendar changes
The Austrian Grand Prix returned to the calendar after a nine-year absence. 
The Luxembourg Grand Prix was added to the world championship for the first time, after being held as a non-championship race from 1949 until 1952.
The Portuguese Grand Prix was originally scheduled as the final round of the season, to be held at the Estoril circuit on 26 October. It was cancelled and replaced by the European Grand Prix after the owners of the Estoril circuit failed to make requested changes to it.

Season summary

The season started in Australia, with Canadian Jacques Villeneuve taking the first pole position of the season. The moment was short-lived, however, as Villeneuve was out of the race at the first corner after colliding with Johnny Herbert. McLaren's David Coulthard went on to win the race, the second of his career, with Michael Schumacher finishing second and Mika Häkkinen finishing in third place.

Villeneuve once again took pole position in Brazil, and once again he was off at the first corner. Luckily for him the race was restarted, and the Canadian took the lead on lap 49 from Gerhard Berger. The Austrian finished second and Olivier Panis continued his impressive form from 1996 with third place.

For the third time in a row, Jacques Villeneuve was again on pole position for Argentina. However, he was spared another first corner collision, and instead it was Michael Schumacher who collided with Rubens Barrichello. With Schumacher out, Eddie Irvine went on to challenge Villeneuve for the lead, and he made several attempts to pass the Canadian's Williams but failed on all his attempts and had to settle for second. Ralf Schumacher, in his first full season, managed to get onto the podium after he finished third.

Villeneuve continued his run of consecutive pole positions in San Marino. Villeneuve's German teammate, Frentzen, won his first and only Grand Prix for Williams after he finished just over a second ahead of Michael Schumacher, with Eddie Irvine coming third.

Frentzen managed to end Villeneuve's run of pole positions in Monaco. For the second time in successive seasons, the Monaco Grand Prix was raced under very wet conditions. Michael Schumacher won his first race of the season with his future Ferrari teammate, Rubens Barrichello finishing in second and earning Stewart not only their first podium finish, but their first points finish and their first finish of any kind. Irvine took the final step on the podium for the second time in a row.

In Spain, Williams continued to dominate the qualifying session, as Villeneuve, for the fifth time this season, took pole and Frentzen made sure Williams occupied both slots on the front row. Villeneuve went on to win the Grand Prix, with fellow French-speaking drivers, Olivier Panis and Jean Alesi, coming second and third respectively.

Williams's run of consecutive pole positions was broken in Canada where Michael Schumacher took pole; Rubens Barrichello's Stewart split the two Williams in third place. Schumacher went on to win the Grand Prix, with ex-Ferrari driver Jean Alesi finishing second and Giancarlo Fisichella coming in third. Schumacher earned his second pole of the season in France; he was accompanied by Frentzen on the front row. The two would stay in their respective positions at the end of the race, with Eddie Irvine in third.

Villeneuve earned his sixth pole of the season in Britain, with teammate Frentzen partnering him on the front row. After Häkkinen retired from the lead, Villeneuve went on to win the race with Alesi and young Alexander Wurz coming third to make it an all Renault-powered podium. Michael Schumacher failed to complete the race after he retired with a wheel bearing problem.

Gerhard Berger, who had not competed at the previous Grand Prix because of the illness and the death of his father, managed to get pole position for the German Grand Prix. Fastest lap and race victory followed, which would ultimately be Berger's and Benetton's final win. Michael Schumacher came second and Mika Häkkinen came third.

The next race, in Hungary, was one of the most memorable races in the 1997 season. Michael Schumacher took pole with Villeneuve partnering him on the front row. Damon Hill, in an Arrows which had not qualified as high as ninth before the Hungarian Grand Prix, qualified up in third place. The start of the race saw Hill overtake Villeneuve's Williams and on lap ten, the Brit overtook Schumacher to take the lead. Hill kept the lead for the final rounds of pit stops, but coming into the finale of the race, Hill reported that his Arrows was having problems, and in the end, Jacques Villeneuve took the lead on the final lap of the race and went on to win the race, achieving the milestone 100th Grand Prix victory for Williams.

After two very exciting Grands Prix, fans were hoping that Belgium would prove to be an exciting one as well. Villeneuve took pole position with Alesi's Benetton completing the front row. The race was wet and Villeneuve dropped down to fifth place, while his championship rival, Michael Schumacher, won the race by starting on intermediate tyres (as opposed to full wet). Fisichella came second, followed by Frentzen in third.

Alesi got his first, and only, pole position of the season in Italy with Frentzen coming second. David Coulthard won the race, his second of the season; pole sitter Alesi came second and Frentzen came third.

In Austria, Villeneuve managed to get his seventh pole position of the 1997 season; the Canadian was partnered on the front row by Finnish driver Mika Häkkinen. Villeneuve went on to win the Grand Prix with Coulthard and Frentzen joining him on the podium in second and third respectively. Michael Schumacher finished 6th after receiving a 10-second stop/go penalty for overtaking under yellow flag conditions.

The next race was the so-called "Luxembourg Grand Prix", actually staged at the Nürburgring in Germany. Mika Häkkinen, who had qualified second at the previous Grand Prix, managed to earn pole. McLaren looked set for a 1–2 finish until both cars broke down in quick succession. Villeneuve was therefore gifted a win, which would end up being his last in F1, while title rival Michael Schumacher was taken out at the first corner. Alesi and Frentzen completed the podium, making it, for the second time in the 1997 season, an all Renault-powered podium.

Japan saw Villeneuve, for the eighth time that season, take pole position. Villeneuve was disqualified from the race, after failing to slow down under yellow flags during qualifying. He raced under appeal, but finished only fifth. Michael Schumacher won the race, while Frentzen came second and Irvine came third. Villeneuve's Williams team dropped his appeal after the race, leaving Schumacher one point ahead of Villeneuve in the Drivers' Championship, meaning that the title would be decided at the season finale in Jerez.

The 1994 finale saw a title deciding collision between Schumacher and Damon Hill. At Jerez, the qualifying session was noteworthy, as three drivers, Villeneuve, Schumacher, and Frentzen, all registered the same fastest qualifying time. Villeneuve was awarded pole position since he had set the time first, and this would be the final pole of his F1 career. At the start of the race, Schumacher had a good start, overtaking Villeneuve to take the lead. By lap 48 Villeneuve was catching up to Schumacher and attempted to overtake. Braking later than the German at the Dry Sac corner, Villeneuve had the inside line and was slightly ahead when Schumacher turned into him, his front right wheel connecting with the sidepod of the Williams car. Schumacher retired on the spot and Villeneuve went to take third place and earn four points, enough to take the 1997 title. Schumacher was later punished by the FIA for causing an avoidable accident and was disqualified from the championship, although his race results (grid position, finishing position, points) still counted towards his official statistics. In the race itself, Mika Häkkinen went on to take his first ever career victory.

Results and standings

Grands Prix

Scoring system

Points were awarded to the top six finishers in each race as follows:

World Drivers' Championship standings

Notes:
 – Driver did not finish the Grand Prix but was classified, as he completed more than 90% of the race distance.
 Drivers who did not score points were not classified in a championship position by the FIA.

World Constructors' Championship standings

Notes:
 – Driver did not finish the Grand Prix but was classified, as he completed more than 90% of the race distance.
 Constructors that did not score points were not classified in a championship position by the FIA.

Notes

References

External links

formula1.com – 1997 official driver standings (archived)
formula1.com – 1997 official team standings (archived)

Formula One seasons
 
Formula 1